DGUSA Untouchable was a professional wrestling event series produced by Dragon Gate USA from 2009-2011. The events involved different wrestlers from pre-existing scripted feuds and storylines. Wrestlers were portrayed as either villains or heroes in the scripted events that build tension and culminate into a wrestling match or series of matches.

As part of Dragon Gate USA's talent exchange agreement with independent promotion, Chikara, wrestlers from either company can work in either vicinity.
At Enter The Dragon/Open the Historic Gate two months prior, Mike Quackenbush, after competing in an eight-man tag team match, came to the ring following his match to give a monologue, known as a promo, to the live crowd in attendance, only to be interrupted by rival from DGUSA, Yamato, leading to an assault, which saw Quackenbush's ally, Jigsaw, come to his aide, which prompted Gran Akuma, to interfere himself, aiding Yamato; this prompted a tag team match between the two respective alliances at Untouchable.

Another match announced for the show was independent wrestler Bryan Danielson against Dragon Gate Open the Dream Gate Champion Naruki Doi, who is often deemed the "ace" of the company's Japanese counterpart. This would be one of Danielson's last matches on the independent circuit before signing with World Wrestling Entertainment (WWE). Conversely, Brian Kendrick was recently released from WWE, and made one of his first appearances back on the independent circuit against CIMA.

Results

2009

Untouchable / Open The Untouchable Gate was a professional wrestling pay-per-view (PPV) event produced by Dragon Gate USA that was taped September 6, 2009 at the Congress Theater in Chicago, Illinois and aired on November 6, 2009.

2010

Untouchable / Open The Untouchable Gate was a professional wrestling pay-per-view (PPV) event produced by Dragon Gate USA that was taped September 25, 2010 at the Congress Theater in Chicago, Illinois and aired on November 12, 2010.

2011

Untouchable / Open The Untouchable Gate was a professional wrestling pay-per-view (PPV) event produced by Dragon Gate USA that was taped September 10, 2011 at the Congress Theater in Chicago, Illinois and aired live.

References

External links
DGUSA.tv

Dragon Gate USA shows
Professional wrestling in the Chicago metropolitan area
2009 in professional wrestling
2010 in professional wrestling
2011 in professional wrestling
Events in Chicago
2000s in Chicago
2009 in Illinois
2010 in Illinois
2010s in Chicago
2011 in Illinois